John Francis was an Irish Anglican priest in the late 17th and early 18th centuries.

He was Prebendary of  St Michael's at Christ Church Cathedral, Dublin from 1665 until 1705; Dean of Lismore from 1695  until 1723; and Dean of Leighlin from 1723 until his death a year later.

References

17th-century Irish Anglican priests
18th-century Irish Anglican priests
Deans of Lismore
1724 deaths
Deans of Leighlin